Marianna/Lee County Airport , also known as Steve Edwards Field, is a public use airport in Lee County, Arkansas, United States. It is owned by the City of Marianna and located three nautical miles (6 km) west of its central business district. This airport is included in the National Plan of Integrated Airport Systems for 2011–2015, which categorized it as a general aviation facility.

Facilities and aircraft 
Marianna/Lee County Airport covers an area of 55 acres (22 ha) at an elevation of 219 feet (67 m) above mean sea level. It has one runway designated 18/36 with an asphalt surface measuring 4,021 by 75 feet (1,226 x 23 m).

For the 12-month period ending July 31, 2012, the airport had 25,050 aircraft operations, an average of 68 per day: 99.8% general aviation and 0.2% military. At that time there were six aircraft based at this airport: 83% single-engine and 17% helicopter.

See also 
 List of airports in Arkansas

References

External links 
 Aerial image as of January 2001 from USGS The National Map
 
 

Airports in Arkansas
Transportation in Lee County, Arkansas
Buildings and structures in Lee County, Arkansas